"Better World" is a song by British music producer Rebel MC. Released in 1990, the song was later included on Rebel MC's debut album, Rebel Music (1990). Upon its release, "Better World" reached number 20 in the United Kingdom, number 10 in the Netherlands, and number four in New Zealand.

Track listings

CD single
 "Better World" (Peace radio mix)
 "Better World" (Peace mix)
 "Better World" (Unity mix)

Cassette single
A. "Better World" (Peace radio mix)
B. "Better World" (Unity mix)

7-inch single
A. "Better World" (Peace radio mix)
B. "Better World" (Unity radio mix)

12-inch single
A. "Better World" (Peace mix)
B. "Better World" (Unity mix)

Charts

Weekly charts

Year-end charts

References

1989 songs
1990 singles
Rebel MC songs